Siarhei Shylovich (born 16 May 1986) is a Belarusian handball player for Meshkov Brest and the Belarusian national team.

References

External links

1986 births
Living people
Belarusian male handball players
People from Babruysk
Expatriate handball players in Poland
Belarusian expatriate sportspeople in Poland
Sportspeople from Mogilev Region